Julio Castellanos Ramírez (born 21 June 1960) is a Mexican politician from the National Action Party. From 2009 to 2012 he served as Deputy of the LXI Legislature of the Mexican Congress representing Michoacán.

References 

1960 births
Living people
People from Zamora, Michoacán
National Action Party (Mexico) politicians
21st-century Mexican politicians
Deputies of the LXI Legislature of Mexico
Members of the Chamber of Deputies (Mexico) for Michoacán